Hina Rizvi is a Pakistani actress. She is known for her roles in dramas Tishnagi Dil Ki, Umeed, Hari Hari Churiyaan, Neeli Zinda Hai and Quddusi Sahab Ki Bewah.

Early life
Hina was born in 1981 on 16th March in Lahore, Pakistan. She completed her studies from England University of Westminster. Hina's mother Mehtab Rizvi was a screen writer, producer and her father Tayyab Hussain Rizvi was producer.

Career
Hina made her debut as an actress on PTV's sitcom Shortcut in 2003 opposite Faysal Qureshi. She was noted for her roles in dramas Main Soteli, Babul Ki Duayen Leti Ja, Yehi Hai Zindagi, Yehi Hai Zindagi Season 2, Aap Ko Kya Takleef Hai and Jaltay Khwab. She also appeared in dramas Ullu Baraye Farokht Nahi, Kalmoohi, Rishton Ki Dor and Bunty I Love You, Quddusi Sahab Ki Bewah. Since then she appeared in dramas Tere Bina, Mehram, Tishnagi Dil Ki and Umeed. She also appeared in movies Ishq Positive, Balu Mahi and Halla Gulla.

Personal life
Hina's elder sisters Sangeeta and Kaveeta are both actress. Hina's older brother Raza Ali Rizvi was also a producer. She is also the aunt of British American actress Jiah Khan.

Filmography

Television

Web series

Telefilm

Film

Awards and nominations

References

External links
 
 

1981 births
Living people
Pakistani television actresses
21st-century Pakistani actresses
Pakistani film actresses
Rizvi family